Louise Siversen (born 29 May 1958) is an Australian actress. She is known for her television roles, including Lou Kelly in Prisoner (1984–1986), Debbie in The Flying Doctors (1986–1990), and since 2012 as Heather Looby in House Husbands. She has also appeared on stage and in film.

Training 
Born in Melbourne, Siversen began acting as a child after her parents sent her to dance and drama classes to help her overcome her shyness. Siversen began to enjoy acting and went on to perform with St Martins Youth Theatre, appearing in many productions. Siversen was to study law, but decided to stick with acting after attending a Career Day at university.

Siversen has also trained in jazz dance and ballet.

Career

Television
Siversen is best known for her portrayal of nasty Louise "Lou" Kelly in the Network Ten series Prisoner. Siversen had done several bit-parts in the series and at the time the character of Lou was devised and had been a regular extra for several months, playing one of the prisoners. Siversen auditioned, and got the part. Lou quickly became one of the main characters of the series and had a run of three years.

Her other TV credits include The Flying Doctors, Halifax f.p., 'Sugar and Spice, BackBerner, MDA, All Saints, Janus, Rush, Special Squad and House Husbands.

Film
She appeared in the 1989 Australian horror film Houseboat Horror.

Stage
Siversen appeared in several productions for the Malthouse Theatre, Melbourne and the Melbourne Theatre Company. She also wrote her one-woman show Coming to My Senses in 1993. In 2017 she played Dotty/Mrs Clacket in Michael Frayn's Noises Off'' for the Melbourne Theatre Company and Queensland Theatre.

She teaches drama at the Victorian College of Arts.

Personal life 

Siversen is married to Theo. They live in Melbourne.

Siversen has been an Iyengar Yoga student for over 15 years and is also an avid walker, having walked the Camino Frances in Spain in 2009 an 800 km walk across Northern Spain.

References

External links
 
 
 Profile at Creative Representation

20th-century Australian actresses
21st-century Australian actresses
Australian film actresses
Australian soap opera actresses
Australian stage actresses
1958 births
Living people
Actresses from Melbourne